Won of the Red Army Command were banknotes issued by the Soviet military command in North Korea and circulated from 1945 to 1947 in parallel with the Korean yen, and then with the DPRK won.

History  
After liberation from Japanese forces, Korea was divided into two zones under the control of the American and Soviet military commanders. The zone dividing line ran along the 38th parallel. In circulation in both zones, the Korean yen continued to be used, the issue of which was made by the Bank of Joseon, located in the American zone of occupation, which did not give the Soviet military command the opportunity to use the issue of the bank to cover the costs of maintaining troops. In October 1945, 1, 5, 10 and 100 won banknotes were issued on behalf of the Red Army Command. The banknotes bear the date "1945" and the text is in Korean. The issue of banknotes was mainly limited to the locations of Soviet military units.

In December 1947, a monetary reform was carried out in North Korea, and the North Korean won was introduced instead of the Korean yen. The Won of the Red Army Command was not withdrawn from circulation during the reform, but its further release was discontinued.

List of banknotes

See also 

 Yuan of the Red Army Command
 Manchukuo yuan
 Tuvan akşa

References

Bibliography

External links 
 Банкноты Командования Красной армии на сайте fox-notes.ru

Currencies of North Korea
Currencies introduced in 1945